Steven Alexander Rutt (February 26, 1945 – May 20, 2011) was an American engineer who in 1972, along with Bill Etra, co-created an early video animation synthesizer, the Rutt/Etra Video Synthesizer. His equipment was used in the early pioneering synthesized animation for the 1976 Academy Award winning movie Network.

He was the founder of Rutt Video & Interactive, a Manhattan-based video post-production studio (RVI.com). There, he mentored and employed numbers of SVA students, alumni and faculty members for over three decades, and provided editing services for many famous musicians and filmmakers.

Steve Rutt was born in Manhattan on Feb. 26, 1945, and spent his childhood in Great Neck, Long Island. He is the father of Victoria Mara Rutt.

Early life and childhood

Education

Career

Death
Rutt died on May 20, 2011 in New York, New York of pancreatic cancer.

References

External links
 
 Homepage for Rutt Video & Interactive

1945 births
2011 deaths
Engineers from New York City
People from Manhattan
Deaths from pancreatic cancer
Deaths from cancer in New York (state)
People from Great Neck, New York